The Mansion of Bahjí (Qasr Bahjī, mansion of delight) is a summer house in Acre, Israel where Baháʼu'lláh, the founder of the Baháʼí Faith, died in 1892. He was buried in an adjacent house, which became the Shrine of Baháʼu'lláh, a place of pilgrimage and the Baháʼí Qiblih. The whole area was called Al-Bahjá (Place of Delight).

Mansion of Bahjí

Baháʼu'lláh's son ʻAbdu'l-Bahá first rented, and then purchased, the mansion for his father and the Baháʼí holy family to live in, and Baháʼu'lláh moved from Mazra'ih to Bahji and resided in the building until his death. In 1890 the Cambridge orientalist Edward Granville Browne met Baháʼu'lláh in this house; after this meeting he wrote his famous pen-portrait of Baháʼu'lláh.

When Baháʼu'lláh died in 1892 he was interred in one of the surrounding buildings. The site has since been beautified with paradise gardens, which are termed Haram-i-Aqdas (the Most Holy Precincts or Sanctuary) and are intersected by a circular path that serves to circumambulate the shrine of Baháʼu'lláh. The Mansion, shrine, and surrounding gardens are among the most sacred spots on earth for Baháʼís and are Baháʼí pilgrimage sites.

Shrine

The Shrine of Baháʼu'lláh is composed of a central area that contains a small, tree-filled garden surrounded by paths covered with Persian rugs. A glass roof was constructed by Qulám-ʻAlíy-i-Najjár after the death of Baháʼu'lláh. At the northwest corner of the central area there is a small room containing Baháʼu'lláh's remains. The central area has doors to a number of other rooms that have, in recent years, been opened to accommodate the growing number of pilgrims and visitors.

During obligatory prayers Baháʼís face the Qiblih, which is the Shrine of Baháʼu'lláh, comparable in practice to Muslims facing the Kaaba during daily prayer, or Christians/Jews facing Jerusalem. The Báb changed the direction of prayer to He whom God shall make manifest, a role claimed by Baháʼu'lláh. Baháʼís during his lifetime prayed facing the person of Bahá'u'lláh, until the spot became fixed when he was buried. A Tablet explaining this existed but had been stolen by Covenant-breakers.

The shrine and its surrounding gardens, as well as the Mansion of Bahjí, were inscribed on the World Heritage List in July 2008.

History

The area was originally a garden planted by Sulayman Pasha, who was the ruler of Acre, for his daughter Fatimih, and he named it Bahji. Later the area was further beautified by ʻAbdu'llah Pasha, and in 1831 when Ibrahim Pasha besieged Acre he used the property as his headquarters. The property was well known for its beautiful gardens and pond fed by an aqueduct. The property then fell into the possession of a Christian family, the Jamals.

In 1870 ʻUdi Khammar, a wealthy merchant from Acre who also originally owned the House of ʻAbbúd, bought some of the land from the Jamals close to the mansion of ʻAbdu'llah Pasha and built the Mansion of Bahji, over an earlier and smaller building, which Abdu'llah Pasha had built for his mother. Udi Khammar placed an Arabic inscription over the door in 1870 which reads: "Greetings and salutation rest upon this Mansion which increaseth in splendour through the passage of time. Manifold wonders and marvels are found therein, and pens are baffled in attempting to describe them." ʻUdi Khammar had built the house for his family, and when he died was buried in a tomb in the south-east corner of the wall directly around the building. In 1879 an epidemic caused the inhabitants to flee and the building became vacant.

The shrine, after ʻAbdu'l-Bahá's death, was occupied by Mírzá Muhammad ʻAlí and his supporters, who forcibly took the keys to the shrine in January 1922. The governor of Acre ordered the keys to be returned to the authorities and a guard was posted at the shrine. In early 1923 the keys were returned to Shoghi Effendi. In the 1950s, Shoghi Effendi had made plans for a future superstructure, which would surround the whole area and would include a platform with 95 marble columns, each 6 meters high. Shoghi Effendi has called the shrine the Daryá-yi-Núr (Ocean of Light), which has taken the Kúh-i-Núr (Mountain of Light, the Shrine of the Báb) under its shadow.

At the entrance to these gardens stands a wrought iron decorative gate called "Collins Gate" named after Amelia Collins.

Image gallery

See also
Burial places of founders of world religions
Baháʼí gardens
Baháʼí pilgrimage
Baháʼí World Centre
Religious significance of the Syrian region

Notes

References

External links

The Baháʼí Gardens - official website
Baháʼí Pilgrimage - Shrine of Baháʼu'lláh
The  Baháʼí Gardens in Bahjí - photo gallery

Bahá'í pilgrimages
Bahá'í shrines in Israel
Gardens in Israel
Baháʼu'lláh
Bahá'í gardens
Buildings and structures in Northern District (Israel)
Tourist attractions in Northern District (Israel)